Thomas or Tom Logan may refer to:
Thomas Logan, a character of Marvel Comics
Tom Logan (footballer) (born 1985), Australian rules footballer
Tom Logan (water polo), New Zealand water polo player
Tom Logan (director) (born 1953), film and TV director
Tom Logan, a character in the Scary Movie films
Thomas M. Logan (1840–1914), Confederate general
Tommy Logan (1888–1960), Scottish footballer (Falkirk FC, Chelsea FC and Scotland)

See also
Logan Tom (born 1981), American volleyballer